The Spain men's national water polo team (Spanish: Selección de polo acuático España) represents Spain in men's international water polo competitions and it is controlled by Real Federación Española de Natación.

Spain has won one gold Olympic medal and three World Championships, making them one of the most successful men's water polo teams in the world. They also have won 2 Olympic, 6 World Championships, 5 World Cup, 3 World League, 5 European Championships and 2 Europa Cup medals.

Results

Olympic Games

World Championship

World Cup

World League

European Championship

Europa Cup

Mediterranean Games

Current squad
Roster for the 2020 Summer Olympics.

Youth teams

U-20
 FINA Junior Water Polo World Championships
 Winner: 1983, 1987, 1991
 Runner-up: 1993, 2011
 Third place: 2005

U-18
 FINA Youth Water Polo World Championships
 Runner-up: 2014, 2018

U-19
 LEN European U19 Water Polo Championship
 Winner: 1980
 Runner-up: 1970, 1971, 1975, 1992, 2008
 Third place: 1973, 1976, 1984, 1994, 2006, 2016, 2018

U-17
 LEN European U17 Water Polo Championship
 Runner-up: 2015, 2017, 2019
 Third place: 2011

See also
 Spain men's Olympic water polo team records and statistics
 Spain women's national water polo team
 Royal Spanish Swimming Federation
 List of Olympic champions in men's water polo
 List of men's Olympic water polo tournament records and statistics
 List of world champions in men's water polo

References

External links

Men's national water polo teams
 
Men's sport in Spain